The second series of The Great British Sewing Bee started on 18 February and ended after eight episodes on 8 April 2014. Claudia Winkleman returned to present as well as resident judges May Martin and Patrick Grant. The series was filmed at Metropolitan Wharf in London.

Sewers

Results and elimination

Colour key
 Sewer got through to the next round
 Sewer was eliminated
 Sewer won best Garment of the week
 Sewer was the series runner-up
 Sewer was the series winner
 Sewer withdrew

Episodes
 Sewer eliminated   Best Garment  Winner  Sewer withdrew from the Sewing bee

Episode 1

Cliff became ill and left the show, so no sewer was eliminated by the judges.

Episode 2: Pattern Week

Episode 3: Stretch Fabric Week

Episode 4: Children's Clothes

Episode 5: Tricky Fabrics Week

Episode 6: Vintage Week

Episode 7: Semifinal

Episode 8: Final

Reunion special
A reunion special with the series 2 contestants was broadcast in January 2015.

Ratings
All ratings are taken from BARB.

References

2014 British television seasons
The Great British Sewing Bee